Clarisa is a Mexican telenovela produced by Juan Osorio for Televisa in 1993.

Gabriela Roel and Manuel Landeta starred as protagonists, while Laura Flores starred as main antagonist.

Plot 
In the 30s, in a large estate known as "Los Arrayanes", Guillermo González León lives with her two beautiful daughters. The oldest is Elide, a frivolous, passionate and ambitious woman, while the smaller, Clarisa, is cheerful, sweet and sensitive. Elide is a bitter woman, because she has always felt that her father prefers Clarisa, so she has a deep hatred for her sister.

The latter is placed in a school for girls, which deprives it of its great spirit of freedom and their great desire to see the world. Clarisa deeply loves her father and he loves her, so Don Guillermo suffers for his estrangement and hatred he feels his eldest daughter to the child.

Cast 
 
Gabriela Roel as Clarisa González León
Manuel Landeta as Dr. Roberto Arellano/Rolando Garza
Laura Flores as Elide González León
Ariel López Padilla as Gastón Bracho Sanabria
Rolando de Castro Sr. as Don Guillermo González León
David Reynoso as Don Jaime Bracho Sanabria
Regina Torné as Doña Beatriz de Bracho Sanabria
Rafael Rojas as Darío Bracho Sanabria
Raúl Buenfil as Dr. Javier
Aarón Hernán as Dr. Héctor Brenes
Dolores Beristáin as Dolores de Brenes
Germán Robles as Eleuterio Cardona
Leticia Perdigón as Aurelia Bracho Sanabria
Ramiro Orci as Santiago
Alicia Montoya as Casilda
Carmelita González as Sofía
Claudia Guzmán as Rosita
Toño Infante as Efraín
Luis Rizo as Antonio
Guadalupe Deneken as Ofelia
Blas García as Balmaseda
Guillermo de Alvarado "Condorito" as Pichón
Carlos Navarro as Genaro Martínez
Marisol Centeno as Itzel
Guillermo Rivas as Sacerdote
Luis Aguilar as Neto
Tere Mondragón as Teacher Josefina
Miriam Calderón as Adriana
Ana Bertha Espín
Maty Huitrón
Isabel Andrade
Rigoberto Carmona
Esteban Franco
Claudia Marín
Alejandra Murga
Guadalupe Bolaños
Polo Salazar
Luis Couturier
Dunia Saldívar
Ramón Menéndez
Maritza Aldaba
Maricarmen Vela
Consuelo Duval
Ricardo Carrión
Alejandro Ciangherotti Jr.
Miguel Ángel Fuentes
Anthony Álvarez
Melba Luna
Palmira Santz

Awards

References

External links

1993 telenovelas
Mexican telenovelas
1993 Mexican television series debuts
1993 Mexican television series endings
Spanish-language telenovelas
Television shows set in Mexico
Televisa telenovelas